Albert William Du Aime (November 7, 1925 – October 29, 2008), more commonly known by his pen name William Wharton, was an American-born author best known for his first novel Birdy, which was also made into a critically acclaimed film of the same name in 1984.

Early life, family and education
Wharton was born in Philadelphia, Pennsylvania, to "a poor, hard-working, Catholic family". He graduated from Upper Darby High School in 1943. (He was inducted into the school's Wall of Fame in 1997.)

During World War II, Wharton served in the United States Army and was first assigned to an engineering unit. He was transferred to the infantry and was severely wounded in the Battle of the Bulge. His memoirs included an account of his role in the killing of German prisoners during the war. "War for me, though brief, had been a soul-shaking trauma. I was scared, miserable, and I lost confidence in human beings, especially myself." 

After his discharge, he attended the University of California, Los Angeles, where he received an undergraduate degree in art and a doctorate in psychology.

Career
He taught art in the Los Angeles Unified School District.

His first novel Birdy was published in 1978 when he was more than 50 years old. Birdy was a critical and popular success and it won the US National Book Award in category First Novel.
Alan Parker directed a film version starring Nicolas Cage and Matthew Modine. 

After the publication of Birdy and through the early 1990s, Wharton published eight novels, including Dad and A Midnight Clear, both of which were also made into films. Dad starred Jack Lemmon and Ethan Hawke in one of his first movie roles.  Hawke also starred in A Midnight Clear.

In 1988, Wharton's daughter, Kate, his son-in-law Bill, and their two children, two-year-old Dayiel and eight-month-old Mia, were killed in a 23-car motor vehicle accident near Albany, Oregon, caused by smoke generated by grass-burning on nearby farmland. Wharton wrote a (mostly) non-fiction book, Ever After: A Father's True Story (1995), which recounts the incidents leading to the accident, his family's subsequent grief, and the three years which he devoted to pursuing redress in the Oregon court system for the field-burning that caused the accident. Houseboat on the Seine, a memoir, was published in 1996, about Wharton's purchase and renovation of a houseboat.

Wharton gained an enormous and unusual popularity in Poland, where many extra editions of his book as well as visits followed. Eventually, many of Wharton's works were translated and published exclusively in the Polish language (see the Bibliography).

Personal life and demise
Wharton died on 29 October 2008 in a hospital in Encinitas, California.

Books

Novels

Non-fiction

Movies based on Wharton's books
Birdy (1984)
Dad (1989)
A Midnight Clear (1992)

References

External links
Upper Darby High School Wall of Fame
Biographical essay in Polish
"Bert" Book about William Wharton in Polish
Website:  http://wharton-duaime.wixsite.com/williamwharton/

Book you can order:  http://www.blurb.com/b/8259743-invitation-into-a-neighborhood  (the PDF is on the website)

 
1925 births
2008 deaths
20th-century American male writers
21st-century American male writers
20th-century American novelists
21st-century American novelists
American male novelists
Infectious disease deaths in California
National Book Award winners
United States Army personnel of World War II